Karanasa modesta is a butterfly of the family Nymphalidae. It is found in India.

Subspecies
Karanasa modesta modesta (north-western India (Deosai Plains))
Karanasa modesta gemina Avinoff & Sweadner, 1951 (Punjab Himalayas)
Karanasa modesta baltorensis Avinoff & Sweadner, 1951 (north-western India (Baltistan))

References

Satyrini
Butterflies described in 1893